Toarcibatis is an extinct genus of rays that lived during the Early Jurassic. It contains four valid species which have been found in Belgium, France, Luxembourg, and Spain. It was originally referred to the family "Archaeobatidae", but was later reassigned to the family Toarcibatidae.

References

Prehistoric cartilaginous fish genera